William Butler  (1872 – 1953) was a Welsh international footballer. He was part of the Wales national football team, playing 2 matches and scoring 1 goal. He played his first match on 3 February 1900 against Scotland and his last match on 24 February 1900 against Ireland.

See also
 List of Wales international footballers (alphabetical)

References

External links
 

1872 births
Welsh footballers
Wales international footballers
Place of birth missing
1953 deaths
Association football forwards
Druids F.C. players